Andríy Kóbolyev (born August 16, 1978) is a Ukrainian politician and businessman, former chief executive officer of Ukrainian largest national oil and gas company Naftogaz.

From 2020 Andriy Kobolyev has been a member of the supervisory board of Ukrainian telecommunications company Kyivstar.

In October 2014, Kobolyev was named a global "Top 40 under 40" (years of age) leader by Fortune.

Early life
The son of a scientist and an English teacher, Andriy Kobolyev was born in Kyiv on August 16, 1978.

In 2000, he graduated from the Institute of International Relations of Taras Shevchenko National University of Kyiv with a master's degree in international economic relations.

Career

Early career 
While studying, Andriy Kobolyev started his career in PricewaterhouseCoopers (1999–2002). 

Kobolyev joined Naftogaz in 2002 as a consultant on corporate strategy. From 2006 to 2007, he was the Director of the Department for Corporate Finance and Price Policy, and from 2008 to 2010, he was an adviser to the CEO. 

From 2010 to 2014, Kobolyev was an adviser at AYA Capital private investment and banking group.

CEO of Naftogaz 
Kobolyev took over as CEO of Naftogaz in March 2014 after the 2014 Ukrainian Revolution of Dignity. That summer, Gazprom cut off supplies, citing billions of dollars in unpaid bills.

Immediately upon entering office, he faced with the challenges of negotiations with Gazprom (seeking to increase the price of gas to Ukraine by 80% ), domestic companies refusing to pay their debts, and Russia seeking to prevent Ukraine importing gas from Europe.

Diversification and freedom from Russian gas

In the two years since taking over Naftogaz, Andriy Kobolyev cut the company's dependence on gas from Russia's PJSC Gazprom, a change crucial for Ukraine's security and Europe's.

In 2014, Gazprom supplied 90 percent of Ukraine's domestic needs.

Since 2015, Ukraine has not bought a single cubic metre of natural gas from Russia. All imported volumes come from the European market through Poland, Slovakia, and Hungary. During the winter of 2014–15, the Kremlin tried to block Ukraine's European gas imports by cutting natural gas supply to the EU. This move failed to have any tangible impact on Ukraine, although Gazprom, the Russian state-owned energy group, lost almost $5.5bn in the process.

Ukraine has Europe's fourth-largest proven gas reserves, after Russia, Norway, and the Netherlands. Kobolyev said that Ukraine also has the potential to become self-sufficient in natural gas if a collaborative plan between the company, government, and private sector is devised.

Fighting with the corruption and oligarchs

Kobolyev has sought to loosen the grip of business and political leaders on the company. He said he had spent these years in Naftogaz fighting corruption, boosting profits, and lessening his nation's dependence on Russia.

Kobolyev started by putting an end to several intermediaries that were earning “unjustified profits” by buying gas from Russia and selling it to Ukraine. By this time, RosUkrEnergo had already been sidelined, but other mediators had cropped up.

Then, in 2015, Naftogaz said it had cut off gas to two Firtash-controlled (Dmytro Firtash is a Ukrainian billionaire and oligarch) chemical factories until they agreed to pay debts of $120 million. Firtash's company said the standoff lasted four months.

The Naftogaz chief also pressed the Ukrainian government, overseen from April 2016 to August 2019 by Prime Minister Groysman, to scrap the regulations that require the gas company to supply the non-paying oblgazy. Kobolyev said those pleas fell on deaf ears.

Kobolyev's return to the company has thrown him in the middle of some messy politics – a challenge he has met with confidence, Western officials say.

Kobolyev faced Ihor Kolomoiskyi, a grizzled media, and banking tycoon who had fallen out of favor with the government. In a shareholder meeting years ago, Kolomoiskyi was fighting to keep control of Naftogaz's oil production arm, Ukrnafta, where he is a minority shareholder.

For years, Naftogaz's top managers had been grappling with corrupt government officials, trying to explain to them the benefits of becoming a more modern, open market energy system in line with EU standards for the oil and gas trade.

Making Naftogaz the largest contributor to the state budget

Andriy Kobolyev has worked to transform the creaking monopoly Naftogaz into a competitor in the regional energy market capable of generating needed cash.

The gas giant's financial performance has improved under Kobolyev. When he took over in March 2014, Naftogaz lost billions of dollars a year. In 2018, it turned a profit and contributed 15 percent of the government's revenue through tax and dividend payments.

From 2015 to 2019 – net contributions to the state budget were +$9bn.

In 2016 Naftogaz became the largest taxpayer in Ukraine.

In 2019, Naftogaz generated a net profit of UAH 50.6 billion, of which 95% was paid to the state as dividends. It was a new record for Naftogaz or any other state-owned company in Ukraine.

14% of revenues to the state budget in 2019 was contributed by Naftogaz.

Corporate governance reform

Naftogaz became the first state-owned company in Ukraine to introduce corporate governance best practices compliant with OECD Guidelines. The Corporate Governance Action Plan (CGAP), developed by experts and legal advisers, became the roadmap for reform.

2016 saw the first supervisory board formed with a majority of independent directors, Supervisory Board committees formed, a corporate secretary appointed, and the implementation of a proper corporate governance system.

Lobbying against Nord Stream 2

Kobolyev and Naftogaz's team were lobbying for measures to stall further the $11 billion pipeline that aims to reroute European Union-bound Russian gas supplies, circumventing established routes through Ukraine.

On February 22, 2022, Germany stopped the Nord Stream 2 gas pipeline certification in reaction to Russia's recognition of the self-proclaimed republics in Luhansk and Donetsk in east Ukraine, the chancellor, Olaf Scholz, has announced.

Naftogaz-Gazprom Arbitration

Naftogaz and Gazprom initiated the Gas Sales Arbitration on June 16, 2014. In its Request for Arbitration, Gazprom claimed payment of unpaid invoices for gas delivered under the Gas Sales Contract from November 2013 to May 2014, while Naftogaz claimed a retroactive revision of the price under the Gas Sales Contract and compensation for previous overpayments under the prices applied before the revision.

On February 28, 2018, the arbitral tribunal issued the final award on the case of Naftogaz against Gazprom relating to the Gas Transit Contract.

As a result, Naftogaz team won and successfully collected $4,63 bn from Gazprom.

Unbundling of the GTS

In 2019 Naftogaz performed unbundling of the gas transmission system operator (GTS) in six months.

The successful unbundling of the GTS operator made it possible to sign a new transit deal with Gazprom on beneficial terms for Ukraine. This new contract guarantees at least US$7.2 billion in stable revenues until 2024.

Naftogaz's retail business

On August 1, 2020, Ukraine abandoned the Public Service Obligations (PSO) regime, and natural gas retail supply market liberalization finally took place. Liberalization allowed household customers to choose the preferred gas supplier based on its value proposition. Suppliers, from their side, are now free to set the price and compete for customers.

Naftogaz, led by Kobolyev, prepared well for market liberalization and outperformed its plans in terms of client portfolio growth, increasing its customer base 2.5 times from 251 thousand households as of August 1, 2020, to 619 thousand households by the end of 2020 (and 901 thousand customers as of March 31, 2021).

Naftogaz became a national natural gas supplier to households, expanding its presence into all Ukrainian regions through an effective online and offline partnership model. In 2020, the company engaged nearly 2000 partner branches to subscribe and consult customers.

As a result, the Naftogaz retail business has a national presence, having outperformed its plans in terms of customer growth by over 100% in 2020.

Attack on the life

In November 2015, an unidentified gunman fired shots just over the roof of Kobolyev's car, hitting his house as he was leaving on a business trip.

Kobolyev suspects that the attempt on his life happened because of his anti-corruption activities, which made him many enemies in Ukraine. However, he considered it as an act of intimidation. “Because if they wanted to kill, they probably would have shot with more accuracy," Andriy Kobolyev said.

Kobolyev said he did not know who was responsible for the attack. Afterward, he beefed up his security detail.

The annual salary for charity

In January 2019, Andriy Kobolyev decided to give all his salary to charity from February 2019 to the end of 2019. The total amount of money from Kobolyev to charity during 2019 was UAH 11.4 million.

Dismissal from Naftogaz

On April 28, 2021 the Cabinet of ministers of Ukraine dismissed Andriy Kobolyev from the post of the head of Naftogaz, and appointed Yuriy Vitrenko as a Chairman of the Board of Naftogaz.

The supervisory board, which the Cabinet of Ministers of Ukraine temporarily suspended to dismiss Kobolyev, stated on April 30 that all its members submitted a notice of their resignations, effective from May 14.

Kobolyev's moves toward transparency won him support among Western investors and donors. He was credited with overseeing an energy overhaul that helped Ukraine to narrow its budget deficit, and leading the former Soviet republic to a multibillion-dollar win in a legal dispute with Russian energy giant Gazprom in 2018.

The European Union, the European Bank for Reconstruction and Development, the European Investment Bank, the World Bank, and the International Finance Corporation said in a joint statement on April 30 that they were "seriously concerned" about recent events at Naftogaz.

CEO of Eney

Andriy Kobolyev is the CEO of Eney, diversified decarbonization  and clean energy company that builds and invests in projects that advance the Energy Transition in Ukraine and other Eastern European and Central Asian countries. Eney's goal is to replace high greenhouse gas emission assets with clean alternatives, generate carbon neutral electricity or fuels, capture  and other emissions, and build electricity storage capacity to enhance energy resilience. It focuses on the energy sector and champions the US, UK, and other cutting-edge technologies.

After the 2022 Russian invasion of Ukraine, Andriy Kobolyev is spearheading an international push for comprehensive western energy sanctions against Russia.

References

External links

Businesspeople from Kyiv
1978 births
Taras Shevchenko National University of Kyiv alumni
Living people
Naftogaz people
Ukrainian chief executives
Ukrainian businesspeople in the oil industry
21st-century Ukrainian businesspeople